Sir Arthur Telford Donnelly  (6 June 1890 – 1 February 1954) was a New Zealand lawyer and sports administrator, and chairman of the Bank of New Zealand.

Life and career
Born in Christchurch, Donnelly was educated at Christchurch Boys' High School and Canterbury College. He qualified as a solicitor at 19 and as a barrister at 20, and joined his father's Christchurch law firm, Raymond, Stringer, Hamilton and Donnelly. He served as a sergeant with the New Zealand Expeditionary Force in France in World War I.

A club cricketer with the West Christchurch cricket club from 1908 to 1922, he was a life member of the New Zealand Cricket Council, of which he was chairman of committee for ten years from 1928 and President from 1946 to 1948. He managed the New Zealand cricket team in England in 1931, and played in one of the non-first-class matches at the end of the tour. He was a steward of the Canterbury Jockey Club.

Donnelly was appointed Crown Solicitor for Christchurch in 1921, and became chairman of the Bank of New Zealand in April 1937. He was appointed a Companion of the Order of St Michael and St George, for public services, in the 1939 New Year Honours, and a Knight Commander of the Order of the British Empire in the 1949 New Year Honours. In 1953, Donnelly was awarded the Queen Elizabeth II Coronation Medal.

References

External links
 Obituary in Wisden
 Christchurch Golf Club: History of Club Trophies

1890 births
1954 deaths
New Zealand cricket administrators
People educated at Christchurch Boys' High School
University of Canterbury alumni
People from Christchurch
New Zealand military personnel of World War I
20th-century New Zealand lawyers
New Zealand bankers
New Zealand Companions of the Order of St Michael and St George
New Zealand Knights Commander of the Order of the British Empire
Businesspeople awarded knighthoods